Argus Hamilton is an American stand-up comedian, writer, and host of The Comedy Store Tonight starring Argus Hamilton. Hamilton began his stand-up comedy career at The Comedy Store. His specialty was to make funny comments on the news of the day.

Robin Williams called him "the Will Rogers of the Baby Boom".

Biography 
Argus Hamilton comes from a family of Methodist ministers. He studied at the University of Oklahoma. Hamilton started his comedian's professional career in 1976.

In the summer of 1979, he was the first comedian to move in the iconic Cresthill house in Beverly Hills (the house where many comedians from the Comedy Store would crash), and lived there until 1982 when he went to rehab (Thomas F. Wilson took his room in Cresthill).

Hamilton has made a number of appearances on The Tonight Show (15 or 20 appearances) and has written for television series such as The Richard Pryor Show and Laugh-In.  Hamilton is also a syndicated comedy columnist. He is the host of The Comedy Store Tonight starring Argus Hamilton, a talk show introducing young comics from the Comedy Store.

During the 1980s, Argus Hamilton struggled with an addiction to drugs and alcohol.

References

External links

Living people
American male comedians
American stand-up comedians
American male non-fiction writers
American comedy writers
American columnists
American television personalities
American television writers
American male television writers
American male screenwriters
Comedians from Oklahoma
People from Le Flore County, Oklahoma
Screenwriters from Oklahoma
Year of birth missing (living people)